Mother Basilea, born Klara Schlink (October 21, 1904 in Darmstadt, Germany – March 21, 2001 in Darmstadt) was a Lutheran German religious leader and writer. She was leader of the Evangelical Sisterhood of Mary, which she cofounded, from 1947 to 2001.

Life
Basilea Schlink was a sister of Edmund Schlink, a professor in theology. Her father Wilhelm Schlink was a professor of mechanics. After finishing high school in Braunschweig and Darmstadt, she was educated (from 1923) at the Fröbelseminar in Kassel, and from 1924 at the Inner missions girls' school in  Berlin. In 1929 she became a teacher at the Mission House Malche in Bad Freienwalde (Oder) in German, psychology and church history. After matriculation in 1930 she studied psychology, art history and philosophy in Berlin and Hamburg. This study was completed by a religious-psychologic thesis for her doctorate in psychology about “Consciousness of Sin in adolescent girls and its significance for their battle of faith.”

Schlink was president of the Women's Division of the German Student Christian Movement from 1933 to 1935, and twice interviewed by the Gestapo for her defense of Jews.

Some years later Schlink was living in a badly bombed Germany with few resources, but it was important for her to repent for Germany's cruel treatment of other nations during the war, especially the Jews. She felt the temptation to marry as other young women did. Instead she gave her mission the first priority, and so she became a Sister of Mary.

On March 30, 1947, she and Erika Madauss founded The Evangelical Sisterhood of Mary in Darmstadt. In 1948 both the founders and the first seven sisters became nuns. From then on, Dr. Klara Schlink called herself Mutter Basilea and Erika Madaus called herself Mutter Martyria. Today, The Evangelical Sisterhood of Mary has 11 subdivisions all over the world, with in total 209 sisters, and about 130 of these are situated in Darmstadt.

Books
 Bride of Jesus Christ
 My All for Him
 Fragrance of a Life for God
 Israel, My Chosen People
 Patmos - When the Heavens Opened
 Repentance - The Joy-Filled Life
 You Will Never Be the Same
 Father of comfort (Daily Reflections on the God Who Cares)
 The Hidden Treasure in Suffering (1983 first German edition, 1992 British edition by Kanaan Publications)
 The Eve of Persecution
 Those Who Love Him (1969 Zondervan Publishing House, Grand Rapids MI) (LCCN 69-11639)

References

External links
 International website of Evangelical Sisterhood of Mary
 German website of Evangelische Marienschwesternschaft
 US Website of Evangelical Sisterhood of Mary

1904 births
2001 deaths
20th-century German Lutheran nuns